Robert D. Gaylor (born May 8, 1930) is a retired Chief Master Sergeant of the United States Air Force who served as the 5th Chief Master Sergeant of the Air Force from 1977 to 1979.

Early life
Gaylor was born on May 8, 1930, in Bellevue, Iowa; however, most of his youth was spent in Indiana.

Military career
Gaylor entered the United States Air Force in September 1948 and was assigned to the security police career field, in which he served until 1957. In September 1957 he served as a military training instructor at Lackland Air Force Base, Texas, until February 1962. He then returned to the security police field until July 1965. During Gaylor's security police years, his early assignments were at James Connally Air Force Base, Texas; Laredo Air Force Base, Texas; Kunsan Air Base, Korea; Tachikawa Air Base, Japan; Columbus Air Force Base, Mississippi; and Barksdale Air Force Base, Louisiana.

Gaylor was an honor graduate of Class 65B of the Second Air Force Noncommissioned Officer (NCO) Academy at Barksdale Air Force Base. After graduation in April 1965 he was selected to be an instructor at the academy and taught there until it closed in April 1966. Following a security police tour at Korat Royal Thai Air Force Base, Thailand, Gaylor returned to Barksdale and assisted in reopening the SAC NCO Academy. In February 1970 he became senior enlisted adviser for Second Air Force. In July 1971 Gaylor transferred to Headquarters United States Air Forces in Europe (USAFE), where he traveled to USAFE teaching management techniques. In June 1972 he established the USAFE Command Management and Leadership Center, an in-residence, 60-hour course of instruction for USAFE NCOs. He continued as noncommissioned officer in charge of the center until his selection as USAFE Senior Enlisted Adviser in August 1973. In September 1974 Gaylor was assigned to the Air Force Military Personnel Center, where he traveled extensively as a management and leadership instructor. He became chief master sergeant of the Air Force in 1977 and retired July 31, 1979.

Gaylor was appointed Chief Master Sergeant of the Air Force in 1977. In this role he was adviser to Secretary of the Air Force John C. Stetson and Chiefs of Staff of the Air Force, General David C. Jones and General Lew Allen, on matters concerning welfare, effective utilization and progress of the enlisted members of the Air Force. He was the fifth chief master sergeant appointed to this ultimate noncommissioned officer position.

Later life
After retiring from the Air Force, Gaylor taught, coached, and mentored leaders at all levels for USAA, a Fortune 500 company. In 2006, the NCO academy at Lackland Air Force Base was named the Robert D. Gaylor NCO Academy in his honor.

Awards and decorations

Awarded but not worn as the CMSAF

References

1930 births
Living people
Chief Master Sergeants of the United States Air Force
Recipients of the Legion of Merit